Cerithiopsis tenthrenois is a species of sea snail, a gastropod in the family Cerithiopsidae, which is known from European waters, including the Mediterranean Sea. It was described by Melvill, in 1896.

References

tenthrenois
Gastropods described in 1896